The Renault 12R was an air-cooled inverted V12 aircraft engine developed by the French engineering company Renault in the 1930s. The design was based on mounting two 6Q six-cylinder engines on a single crankshaft. More than one third of production went to power the Caudron C.714 light fighter that fought in the early stages of World War II for the French and Polish Air Forces.

Design and development
The 12R was developed by Renault in the 1930s. The design was derived from the successful Renault Bengali, using the same construction techniques and being of essentially steel construction. It was based on the 4.46, a test engine developed by mounting two 6Q six-cylinder engines on the same crankshaft. The engine retained the bore and stroke of the smaller engine. The cylinders and pistons were made of forged steel and connected in pairs to an eight bearing crankshaft. The crankcase was made of aluminium alloy coated with magnesium. A centrifugal supercharger was mounted to the rear. The engine was produced in both right handed and left handed versions, the difference being the direction of propeller rotation.

Designed to be fitted to a range of aircraft, both civil and military, the engine was originally rated at  when first introduced in 1935. However, the majority manufactured, 290 out of a total production of 325, were the  12Rc introduced in 1939. Of these, 120 powered the Caudron C.714 light fighter that served in World War II. In addition to examples of the aircraft ordered the French Air Force, thirty-five were delivered to the Polish Air Force in France and a further six to the Finnish Air Force, although the latter were not used in combat. The most powerful version was the 12R Spécial of 1937 which produced  at 3250 rpm and powered the single C.712 racing aircraft derived from the fighter.

Variants
Renault 12R
Renault 12Rb
Renault 12Rc
Renault 12Rm
Renault 12Ro
Renault 12R-00 LH rotation
Renault 12R-01 RH rotation
Renault 12R-02
Renault 12R-03
Renault 12R-09
Renault 12R Spécial

Applications
 Caudron C-446
 Caudron C.560
 Caudron C.581
 Caudron C.710
 Caudron C.712
 Caudron C.714
 Caudron C.870
 Dewoitine D.720
 Dewoitine D.750
 Hanriot H.220 (prototype only)
 Romano R.110

Specifications (12R-00)

See also

References

Citations

Bibliography
 
 
 
 
 
 
 
 
 
 

1930s aircraft piston engines
Air-cooled aircraft piston engines
Inverted V12 aircraft engines
12R